The 4 Hours of Silverstone was an endurance motor race held at the Silverstone Circuit near Silverstone, England on 18–19 April 2014, and served as the opening round of the 2014 European Le Mans Series, and the first race under the series' new four-hour format.  The event shared the weekend at Silverstone with the FIA World Endurance Championship's six-hour event.  The French trio of Pierre Thiriet, Ludovic Badey, and Tristan Gommendy won the race overall for TDS Racing, ahead of Race Performance's Michel Frey and Franck Mailleux and Morand Racing's Christian Klien, Gary Hirsch, and Romain Brandela.  The LMGTE category was led by Duncan Cameron, Michele Rugolo, and Matt Griffin for AF Corse, while Team Ukraine's Andriy Kruglyk, Sergii Chukanov, and Alessandro Pier Guidi were victorious in the GTC class.

Qualifying

Qualifying result

Race

Race result
Class winners in bold.

 – The No. 85 Gulf Racing Aston Martin was penalized two laps by race stewards following the race for not adhering to the driver time requirements.

See also
 2014 6 Hours of Silverstone

References

Silverstone
Silverstone